Borzu or Berzu or Barzu may refer to:

Places in Iran
 Borzu, Qasabeh-ye Gharbi, Sabzevar City, Khorasan Razavi Province, Iran

See also
 Borzu Nama, a Persian epic poem and the main character Borzu
 Deh-e Borzu (disambiguation)